Jon R. Guiles (born January 30, 1945) is a lawyer and politician.

Born in Platteville, Wisconsin, Guiles received his bachelor's degree in economics from University of Wisconsin–Madison and his Juris Doctor degree from University of Wisconsin Law School. He practiced law in Oshkosh, Wisconsin. In 1971, he served in the Wisconsin State Assembly as a Republican.

Notes

1945 births
Living people
People from Platteville, Wisconsin
Politicians from Oshkosh, Wisconsin
University of Wisconsin–Madison College of Letters and Science alumni
University of Wisconsin Law School alumni
Wisconsin lawyers
Republican Party members of the Wisconsin State Assembly